The Boss of the Lazy Y is a 1917 American silent Western film directed by Clifford Smith and starring Roy Stewart, Josie Sedgwick and Frank MacQuarrie.

Cast
 Roy Stewart as Calumet Marston
 Josie Sedgwick as Betty Clayton
 Frank MacQuarrie as Tom Taggart
 Graham Pettie as Jim Marston 
 Walt Whitman as Malcolm Clayton
 Aaron Edwards as Neal Taggart
 Frankie Lee as Bob Clayton
 William Ellingford as Dane Toban
 Bill Patton as Dade

References

Bibliography
 Rainey, Buck. Sweethearts of the Sage: Biographies and Filmographies of 258 actresses appearing in Western movies. McFarland & Company, 1992.

External links
 

1917 films
1917 Western (genre) films
American black-and-white films
Films directed by Clifford Smith
Silent American Western (genre) films
Triangle Film Corporation films
1910s English-language films
1910s American films